These tables provide a comparison of netbooks.

Aspects of netbooks that should be considered:
 Mouse layout that is used. Touchpad with 2-buttons below, or touchpad with buttons on each side. The latter may make it hard with some operations needing simultaneous presses.
 Battery capacity and operating time.
 Weight and size. The original concept was below  but some manufacturers tend toward 2 kg (4.4 lb).
 Noise from CPU fan.
 Driver availability for the built-in hardware.
 Operating system choice.
 Presence of built-in HSDPA, etc., may help to avoid USB dongles.

Current production

Legend (weight)
{| class="wikitable"
|-
| Color ||(kg) ||(lb)
|- style="background:#90ffff"
| Blue || < 0.9  || < 2.0 
|- style="background:#e0ffe0"
| Green || 0.9 to 1.125  || 2 to 2.5 
|- style="background:#ffffc0"
| Yellow  || 1.125 to 1.5  || 2.5 to 3.3 
|- style="background:#ffb000"
| Orange || > 1.5  || > 3.3 
|- style="background:#a0a0a0"
| Grey || Variable || Variable
|- style="background:#F8F4FF"
| White || Not Known|| Not Known
|}

Specifications

See also
 Comparison of netbook-oriented Linux distributions
 Comparison of tablet computers
 Ultra-mobile PC (UMPC)
 Linux-based devices
 Netbook, Ultrabook, Chromebook, SubNotebook, Laptop, Portable computer

References

 Netbooks comparison
 
Netbooks